Saint-Clair-sur-Epte (literally Saint-Clair on Epte) is a commune in the Val-d'Oise department in Île-de-France in northern France. It is situated on the river Epte, 10 km southwest of Gisors.

The treaty of Saint-Clair-sur-Epte in 911 established Rollo, a Norse warlord and Viking leader, as the first Duke of Normandy.

Henry I of England seized the castle of Saint-Clair-sur-Epte in 1118.

See also
Communes of the Val-d'Oise department

References

External links
Official website 

Association of Mayors of the Val d'Oise 

Communes of Val-d'Oise